Lice Fabiana Chamorro Gómez (born 22 December 1998) is a Paraguayan professional footballer who plays as a midfielder for Spanish Primera División club Deportivo Alavés and the Paraguay women's national team. She is a right-footed left winger.

Club career
Chamorro played in the Spanish Primera División for Sporting de Huelva between 2018 and 2019.

References

External links
Profile at La Liga

1998 births
Living people
Women's association football wingers
Women's association football fullbacks
Paraguayan women's footballers
Paraguay women's international footballers
Pan American Games competitors for Paraguay
Footballers at the 2019 Pan American Games
Cerro Porteño players
Primera División (women) players
Sporting de Huelva players
Racing de Santander players
Paraguayan expatriate women's footballers
Paraguayan expatriate sportspeople in Spain
Expatriate women's footballers in Spain
Deportivo Alavés Gloriosas players
21st-century Paraguayan women
20th-century Paraguayan women